Kreis Werro (Võru kreis, Верросский уезд) was one of the nine subdivisions of the Governorate of Livonia of the Russian Empire. It was situated in the northeastern part of the governorate (in present-day southeastern Estonia). Its capital was Võru (Werro). The territory of Kreis Werro corresponds to the present-day Võru County, most of Põlva County and parts of Valga County.

Demographics
At the time of the Russian Empire Census of 1897, Kreis Werro had a population of 97,185. Of these, 92.7% spoke Estonian, 3.4% Latvian, 2.0% German, 1.4% Russian and 0.3% Yiddish as their native language.

References